Moise Crăciun (born 2 June 1927) is a Romanian cross-country skier who competed in the 1950s. He finished tied for 61st in the 18 km event at the 1952 Winter Olympics in Oslo. He was born in Săcele. He is the brother of fellow Olympian Niculae-Cornel Crăciun.

External links
18 km Olympic cross country results: 1948-52

1927 births
Possibly living people
Romanian male cross-country skiers
Olympic cross-country skiers of Romania
Cross-country skiers at the 1952 Winter Olympics
People from Săcele